American singer and rapper Ashnikko has released one mixtape, three extended plays (EPs) and 15 singles (including four as a featured artist). Her debut mixtape, Demidevil, was released in 2021.

Studio albums

Mixtapes

Extended plays

Singles

As lead artist

As featured artist

Promotional singles

Guest appearances

Songwriting credits

Notes

References 

Hip hop discographies
Discographies of American artists